Marat Sergeyevich Dzakhmishev (born 25 January 1980) is a Russian former footballer.

External links
 

1980 births
Living people
Russian footballers
Russian expatriate footballers
Expatriate footballers in Azerbaijan
PFC Spartak Nalchik players
FC Chernomorets Novorossiysk players
Russian Premier League players
Turan-Tovuz IK players
FC Dynamo Stavropol players
FC Luch Vladivostok players
Association football midfielders
FC Spartak-UGP Anapa players
Expatriate sportspeople from Georgia (country) in Azerbaijan
FC Mashuk-KMV Pyatigorsk players